The 2015 County Championship Plate, also known as Bill Beaumont Cup Division 2, was the 14th version of the annual English rugby union, County Championship organized by the RFU for the tier 2 English counties. Each county drew its players from rugby union clubs from the third tier and below of the English rugby union league system (typically National League 1, National League 2 South or National League 2 North). The counties were divided into two regional pools (north/south) with three teams in the north division and four in the south, with the winners of each pool meeting in the final held at Twickenham Stadium. New counties to the division included North Midlands and Northumberland who were demoted from the 2014 Bill Beaumont Cup while Surrey came up from the 2014 County Championship Shield having beaten Leicestershire the previous year in the Shield final having won the competition three years in a row.

At the end of the group stage the northern division was won by Eastern Counties who edged out Northumberland while the southern division was won with ease by Surrey who steamrolled through their group.  The counties went through to the final and as group winners will be promoted to the top tier with Surrey making it two promotions in a row.  Surrey then defeated Eastern Counties in the early kickoff at Twickenham Stadium, winning 17 – 3, in what was their fourth consecutive Twickenham appearance.  In terms of individual player performances the top try scorer was Surrey's Ryan Jeffrey who got six tries in the tournament – all coming in the one game against North Midlands.

Competition format
The competition format was two regional group stages divided into north and south, with each team playing each other once.  In the north group each team played one home game (there were three teams in the group) while in the south group, two teams in the group had two home games, while the other two had just the one.  The top side in each group went through to the final held at Twickenham Stadium on 31 May 2015, with both teams also being promoted to the top tier for the following season. Typically there was no relegation although teams have dropped out of the division in the past.

Participating counties and ground locations

Group stage

Division 2 North

Round 1

Round 2

Round 3

Division 2 South

Round 1

Round 2

Round 3

Final

Total season attendances
Does not include final at Twickenham which was a neutral venue and involved teams from all three county divisions on the same day

Individual statistics
 Note if players are tied on tries or points the player with the lowest number of appearances comes first.  Also note that points scorers includes tries as well as conversions, penalties and drop goals.  Appearance figures also include coming on as substitutes (unused substitutes not included).  Statistics also include final.

Top points scorers

Top try scorers

See also
 English rugby union system
 Rugby union in England

References

External links
 NCA Rugby

2015
2014–15 County Championship